Partisan movements in Belarus and Russia emerged following the 2022 Russian invasion of Ukraine. These resistance movements act against the governments of Alexander Lukashenko in Belarus and Vladimir Putin in Russia, whom their detractors view as authoritarian. Elements of the opposition also work to counter the interests of the armed forces of both countries, as well as against civilian supporters of these authorities, in order to put a stop to the war in Ukraine.

Attacks on property of authorities and supporters of the war 

By , cases of arsons of police departments were recorded in Smolensk and Krasnoyarsk.

, at least 23 attacks on military enlistment offices were recorded, 20 of which were arson. The arson attacks were not a single coordinated campaign: behind them were a variety of people: from far-left to far-right groups. Sometimes they were lone actors who did not associate themselves with any movements. Civilian vehicles bearing the letter Z insignia (supporting the war efforts) were also set ablaze.

On , multiple Russian-language outlets reported that a woman named Evgenia Belova doused a parked BMW X6 with accelerant and set it ablaze in Moscow. The vehicle belonged to Yevgeny Sekretarev who reportedly works for the Eighth Directorate of the General Staff of the Armed Forces of the Russian Federation; the Directorate oversees the  handling wartime censorship. A woman detained for the arson also reportedly proclaimed her opposition to the war. The woman is described as 65 years old, a patient of a local "psychoneurological clinic," and lives in the same building as Sekretarev. The woman's relatives further insisted she was never against the Russian authorities, and would never have committed arson against the Russian government.

Rail war

Belarus 

The rail war actively unfolded in Belarus in February 2022. Signaling equipment was destroyed in three Belarusian regions, and railway lines were blocked. As a result of these operations, the work of several branches of the Belarusian railway was disrupted.

Russia 

In Russia, the movements Combat Organization of Anarcho-Communists (BOAK) and Stop the Wagons announced their sabotage activities on the railway infrastructure. According to The Insider, 63 freight trains derailed in Russia between March and June 2022, about one and a half times as much as during the same period the previous year. At the same time, the geography of wagon wrecks shifted to the west, and some trains got into accidents near military units. According to Russian Railways and inspection bodies, half of the accidents are related to the poor condition of the railway tracks.

Attributed to BOAK 

Representatives of BOAK took responsibility not only for dismantling rails and railway sabotage in Sergiyev Posad near Moscow and near Kirzhach, Vladimir Oblast, but also for setting fire to cell towers (for example, in the village of Belomestnoye in the Belgorod Oblast) and even for setting fire to cars of people supporting actions of the Russian leadership. According to the anarchists themselves, their activities were largely inspired by the actions of the Belarusian partisans, who effectively resisted the Russian invasion through the territory of Belarus at the very beginning of the war.

Attributed to Stop the Wagons 

The "Stop the Wagons" movement in Russia claimed responsibility for the derailment of wagons in the Amur Oblast, due to which traffic on the Trans-Siberian Railway was stopped on June 29, for the derailment of a train in Tver on July 5, several wagons with coal in Krasnoyarsk on July 13, as well as freight trains in the Krasnoyarsk Krai at the Lesosibirsk station on July 19, in Makhachkala overnight between 23 and 24 July (the investigating authorities of Dagestan are also considering sabotage as a probable cause of this incident) and on the Oktyabrskaya railway near Babaevo station on August 12. According to the map published by the movement, its activists operate on more than 30% of the territory of Russia.

Assassination of Darya Dugina and the National Republican Army manifesto 

On , a bomb planted in a vehicle killed Darya Dugina; it is widely presumed the bomb was also meant to kill her father, Aleksandr Dugin. Both are identified with Nazbolism, gave statements justifying war against Ukraine, and denied atrocities such as Bucha massacre. The United States sanctioned both figures for their support of the regime and the war; Dugina was sanctioned for her work with Yevgeny Prigozhin in the Russian interference in the 2016 United States elections.

Former State Duma deputy Ilya Ponomarev, who is based in Kyiv, said that a partisan organization called the "National Republican Army" is operating inside Russia and engaged in "overthrowing the Putin regime", and that it was behind the assassination of Dugina. The politician called the event a "momentous event" and said that the partisans inside Russia are ready for further similar attacks. Ponomarev has told several outlets he has been "in touch" with representatives of the organization since April 2022. He states that the group has been involved in unspecified partisan activities. In a May 2022 conference of exiles in Vilnius sponsored by the Free Russia Forum, Ponomarev appealed to attendees to support direct action within Russia. A Spektr reporter noted an indifferent response from the attendees.

Purported manifesto 
Ponomarev read the NRA's purported manifesto on a YouTube channel he owns, February Morning. The text of the manifesto was also shared over February Morning's affiliated Telegram channel, Rospartizan., YouTube's metrics indicate video containing the claim of responsibility and sharing the maniesto is February Morning's most-seen video with 176,646 views.

Doubts of NRA's existence 
Doubts of the NRA's responsibility and its very existence have been raised by a wide variety of commentators. A 22 August 2022 report from Reuters says that "[Ponomarev's] assertion and the group's existence could not be independently verified." The sole suspect named by Russian investigators is a Ukrainian woman whom, Russia claims, is part of its military. The Russian government has also stated that the woman fled to Estonia. The governments of Ukraine and Estonia each denied any role in the assassination.

Exiles denounce Ponomarev 
The veracity of Ponomarev's claims notwithstanding, his endorsement of armed action against the regime resulted in his blacklisting by the Russian Action Committee, an anti-Putin exile group. According to the Committee's statement, this was because he "called for terrorist attacks on Russian territory." The Committee's statement also implied that Dugina was a "civilian" who "did not take part in the armed confrontation," and condemned denunciations of Aleksandr Dugin following the attack as "a demonstrative rejection of normal human empathy for the families of the victims."

Attacks in Bryansk Oblast

On March 2, 2023, the Russian Volunteer Corps claimed responsibility for an attack in the Bryansk Oblast near Russia's border with Belarus in which it allegedly killed and took hostages.

Reaction of the authorities 
The Russian authorities were forced to tighten security measures on the railways.

On April 27, the Belarusian authorities approved amendments to the Criminal Code, providing for the possibility of applying the death penalty "for attempted acts of terrorism."

On May 8, 2022, the Telegram channel of the movement was blocked. According to their own statements, they were blocked "after the publication of a map of railway resistance, which covered over 30% of the territory of Russia." On July 19, the website of Stop the Wagons was blocked by Roskomnadzor in Russia at the request of the Prosecutor General's Office.

In August 2022, a court in Moscow fined the Telegram messenger 7 million Russian rubles (quoted by TASS as equivalent to $113,900 USD) for refusing to remove channels providing instructions for railway sabotage and containing "propaganda pushing the ideology of anarchism."

Attack on Russian plane in Machulishchy 
In late February 2023 an AWACS Beriev A-50U Russian spy plane in Machulishchy, Belarus was reported as damaged. Via Telegram, the organization BYPOL claimed responsibility for what it claimed was a drone attack. Exiled Belarusian dissident Sviatlana Tsikhanouskaya responded to news of the attack stating, "I am proud of all Belarusians who continue to resist the Russian hybrid occupation of Belarus & fight for the freedom of Ukraine."

See also 
 Popular Resistance of Ukraine
 Suspicious deaths of Russian businesspeople (2022–2023)
 Ukrainian resistance during the 2022 Russian invasion of Ukraine
 Primorsky Partisans

Notes

References 

Conflicts in 2022
Opposition to Vladimir Putin
Reactions to the 2022 Russian invasion of Ukraine
Rebellions in Belarus
Rebellions in Russia
Resistance during the 2022 Russian invasion of Ukraine
2022 in Belarus
2022 in Russia
Belarus in the Russo-Ukrainian War